Aivar Õun (born 15 March 1959) is an Estonian politician. He was a member of X Riigikogu representing the Res Publica Party.

Aivar Õun was born in Rakvere. He graduated from the Estonian University of Life Sciences in 1982. From 2009 to 2017, he was the mayor of Konguta.

References

Living people
1959 births
Res Publica Party politicians
Isamaa politicians
Members of the Riigikogu, 2003–2007
Mayors of places in Estonia
Estonian University of Life Sciences alumni
People from Rakvere